Ypacaraí Lake is a major body of water located in Paraguay, about  east of the capital, Asunción. The lake lies in the western part of the Asunción-Sapucai-Villarrica graben, a tectonic depression from the Mesozoic Era, and drains to the northwest through the Salado River into the Paraguay River. The lake is surrounded by three cities: Areguá, Ypacaraí and San Bernardino, the latter two being located on its shore. It is one of Paraguay's two main lakes and the site of many leisure activities.

As a result of the proliferation of toxic algae or cyanobacteria, the lake is the most polluted in Paraguay. The government has banned access to its waters.

Geography

The lake flows into the Salado River, which itself enters the Paraguay River and receives water from various bodies, of water such as the Yagua Resau, Yuquyry, Puente Estrella and Pirayu.

Weather
The weather at the lake is mainly warm. Sunny days are frequent. Temperature varies between  during the summer and  during the winter.

History
The lake's original name was Tapycua. There are several possible explanations for the name. Ypacaraí means "holy lake" and is linked to the legend of the blessing of the lake by Luis de Bolaños around 1600.

Art and culture

Lake Ypacarai is internationally known because of the song “Recuerdos de Ypacarai” ("Memories of Ypacarai") written by Demetrio Ortiz. The song has been performed and recorded by many singers, including Julio Iglesias.

The nearby town of Areguá offers permanent art and crafts exhibitions. The artisan center of La Cuenca hosts a fair where local artists exhibit their work. Visitors and tourists can obtain information at the cultural center Estacion A; there is also an art center, the Guaggari Center, which is located at the entrance to the city and includes a sculpture exhibition. La Casa de la Cultura is a historical museum where temporary exhibitions are also presented. It opens for the Ypacaraí Festival that takes place in September.

Ypacaraí Festival has been held every year in the city of Ypacaraí since 1971. The September gathering hosts folk expression and Paraguayan art, including concerts, dance and theater. According to the City Chamber, the festival “tries to rescue and reinforce the artistic heritage of the Paraguayan culture”. Casa Hassler, a cultural center, is open for the whole year, with permanent and temporary exhibitions. Artists can show their work here for free, and there is also a history museum, a public library and classes in acting and dance.

Tourism
The lake is surrounded by cities with facilities for tourists and other visitors. The lake's beaches are open to the public.

San Bernardino
It has beaches, cultural centers, pubs, and interesting restaurants. San Bernardino is also called the “Summer City” because of its facilities and attractions for visitors during that season.

Areguá
It is a favorite place for writers and well-known personalities. This city also has a public beach. Areguá holds fairs throughout the year where local artisans sell pottery and other goods.

Travel
The lake is visible when visiting one of the surrounding cities. Buses depart to San Bernardino and Ypacaraí from the Asunción Bus Terminal, and there is a bus to Areguá from Avenida San Martín or Aviadores del Chaco in Asunción.

References

 La Magia de Nuestra Tierra- Fundación en Alianza, 2003.
 Jaha, Sitios imperdibles del Paraguay. Revista informativa. Senatur, 2008.

External links
Secretaria Nacional de Turismo
Portal Ypacarai
Festival del Lago

Geography of Central Department
Lakes of Paraguay